Fabrice Benichou (born April 5, 1965) is a French former professional boxer. In 1987 Benichou was rated as the #4 bantamweight in the world. He become World Champion of boxing in 1989. He is three times super bantamweight World Champion, and two times European bantamweight and featherweight champion.

Biography
Benichou was born on April 5, 1965 in Madrid, Spain. He is French of Spanish-Algerian Jewish heritage.

Amateur career
He reached the finals of the French National Bantamweight championship in 1984. He flew all over the world to train boxing in different countries, until take a long time training in Cuba.

Pro boxing career
On January 30, 1988, he won the vacant European Bantamweight title against Thierry Jacob in a ninth-round knockout in Calais, France.

Benichou won the IBF Super Bantamweight championship on March 10, 1989 against Jose Sanabria in a twelve-round split decision. He lost his title a year later to Welcome Ncita in a bout that took place in Tel Aviv.

He contended unsuccessfully for the IBF Featherweight title on September 12, 1992 in a close twelve round split decision against Manuel Medina in France.

He resumed his boxing career in late 2005.

Acting career
A versatile actor, he is best known for the 1996 film Mo, the 2007's TV mini-series Lance of Longinus, the 2008 TV series Doom Doom, the 2009 film Mensch and the 2012 film, The World Belongs to Us.

See also
List of select Jewish boxers

References

External links
 

1965 births
Sportspeople from Madrid
Living people
Featherweight boxers
Bantamweight boxers
Jewish boxers
French people of Spanish-Jewish descent
Spanish emigrants to France
Jewish French sportspeople
World super-bantamweight boxing champions
International Boxing Federation champions
French sportspeople of Algerian descent
Super-bantamweight boxers
French male boxers